WCYB-TV (channel 5) is a television station licensed to Bristol, Virginia, United States, serving the Tri-Cities area as an affiliate of NBC and The CW. It is one of two commercial television stations in the market that are licensed in Virginia (alongside religious station WLFG, channel 68, in Grundy). WCYB-TV is owned by the Sinclair Broadcast Group, which also provides certain services to Greeneville, Tennessee–licensed Fox affiliate WEMT (channel 39) under a local marketing agreement (LMA) with Cunningham Broadcasting. However, Sinclair effectively owns WEMT as the majority of Cunningham's stock is owned by the family of deceased group founder Julian Smith. Both stations share studios on Lee Street on the Virginia side of Bristol (straddling the Virginia–Tennessee line), while WCYB-TV's transmitter is located at Rye Patch Knob on Holston Mountain in the Cherokee National Forest.

History
As early as 1952, companies and groups began competing for a chance to get the better-picture, lower VHF channel 5, allocated to Bristol. A consortium of four Bristol businessmen—Robert Smith, J. Fey Rogers (sales manager of WOPI radio in Bristol, Tennessee), Charles M. Gore and Harry M. Daniel—filed for the channel at Bristol, Tennessee, along with the Appalachian Television Company, owners of WCYB radio (AM 690, now WZAP), for a station on the Virginia side of the state line. The matter came into contest between the two groups; WOPI's group broadened to take in Kingsport radio station WKPT, with plans for studios in both cities. 

On diversity of ownership grounds, a Federal Communications Commission (FCC) hearing examiner found in favor of WCYB's bid in January 1955. A final construction permit grant was made on April 11, 1956, and construction began at once. That May, station planners successfully sought to increase the proposed coverage area by changing the proposed transmitter location to Rye Patch Knob. Meanwhile, studios were leased in a building at Cumberland and Lee streets.

WCYB-TV began broadcasting on August 13, 1956; it primarily continued testing for several more weeks until a full launch on September 1, though the early start allowed it to present coverage of that year's Democratic National Convention. It has always been a primary NBC affiliate, although it carried a secondary ABC affiliation (shared with WJHL-TV, channel 11) until 1969, when WKPT-TV (channel 19) signed on and took the ABC affiliation.

In 1969, the group sold WCYB-TV to Starr Broadcasting; Starr's president and chief stockholder was publisher and columnist William F. Buckley, Jr. of National Review fame. Starr sold Appalachian Broadcasting to the DGH Company/Lamco Communications (former publisher of the Grit newspaper) in 1977. It was sold again to Bluestone Television in 2004, who then merged with Bonten Media Group for $230 million in 2007.

Robert Smith Sr. served as general manager of the station for almost 25 years. During his tenure, well-known newscasters Merrill Moore, Johnny Wood, and Steve Hawkins began their successful careers. Smith also oversaw the construction of a new building in downtown Bristol. The new facility was industry-leading in its design. After Smith's retirement, Joe Conway became General Manager in 1981. During the early '80s, Lamco invested extensively in people, news, programming, equipment, and marketing. WCYB was marketed as "The News Station". At the same time, NBC became the top-rated network with hits like The Cosby Show and Cheers, and WCYB secured top-rated syndicated programs such as Wheel of Fortune and Jeopardy! A hot air balloon with an NBC peacock design was purchased and flown across the region to promote the station. For most of the time from the 1980s to the early 2000s, WCYB claimed to be the highest-rated station in the top 100 U.S. TV markets. In 1984, Conway died suddenly. He was succeeded as general manager in 1985 by Bob Smith, Jr., who had been the station's News Director for several years. During the 1990s and beyond, Joe Macione, Jim McKernan and Jack Dempsey followed as General Managers. Steve Flint was named VP/General Manager in 2018.

In the 1960s, this station produced a live weekday cartoon show for children called the Looney Tunes Club, hosted by Ed Spiegel. The show welcomed some 50 youngsters each day to participate on the show and was traditionally visited by children celebrating their birthdays. Each broadcast was opened with a rousing "Hi, boys and girls!" from Spiegel, with "Hi, Ed!" shouted back by the youngsters. The 1960s also saw three locally produced quiz shows: Kiddle Kollege (which pitted young students from different local schools against each other), Klassroom Kwiz (whose contestants were older high school students, a variation on the It's Academic format) and Klub Kwiz (which did the same using members of local civic and service clubs).

WCYB took over WEMT's operations in February 2006 in a deal with WEMT's new owner, Aurora Broadcasting. As part of the Bonten deal later that year, Esteem Broadcasting bought WEMT from Aurora. Esteem would then pay $1.4 million in outstanding debt. WEMT moved from its studios in Johnson City to WCYB's facilities.

On April 21, 2017, Sinclair announced its intent to purchase the Bonten stations for $240 million. The sale was completed on September 1.

News operation

WCYB's news dominance from the 1980s and beyond was largely due to the presence of the station's longtime anchormen Merrill Moore, Johnny Wood, and Steve Hawkins. Moore joined the station in 1962 as the weeknight 11 o'clock anchor and added the weeknight 6 p.m. broadcast in 1964. He remained the station's top anchorman until his retirement in 2000. In the 1960s, News Director Walter Crockett also delivered editorials at 6:25 p.m. daily, and Evelyn Booher was one of the first woman newscasters in the Tri-Cities at that time. For most of the time from the 1980s to the early 2000s, WCYB claimed to be the highest-rated television station in the United States. In January 2005, WCYB won the RTNDA's Ultimate Newscast Makeover contest, which included a new set, graphics and music package at no charge. The station's slogan is currently "Accurate. Reliable. Getting The Facts Right." Formerly, it was "Accurate. Reliable. To the Point." The latter phrase was dropped from the slogan as of the Noon telecast on October 2, 2007. After beginning local production of news in high definition, the slogan was changed to "Accurate. Reliable. High Definition."

WCYB currently broadcasts 25 hours of locally-produced newscasts each week (with five hours on weekdays, two hours on Saturdays, two hours on Sundays, and updates every half-hour during Today, in addition to updates during prime time programming). WCYB also produces Fox Tri-Cities News @ 10 on sister station WEMT.

Starting with the 5:00 p.m. news on October 13, 2008, the NewsCenter 5 name was changed to News 5. WEMT's nightly 10 o'clock newscast started on September 12, 2005 and it is produced by WCYB. Originally a half-hour long, it has expanded to an hour on September 11, 2006. In October 2008, they dropped WCYB's on-air look. Instead of using all blue graphics, WEMT now employs blue and red. That station also renamed the weather forecasting and modified many other elements of the broadcast.

On June 17, 2010, WCYB's newscasts became the first in the Tri-Cities market to broadcast in high definition. Starting with the 2012 election day newscast, WCYB debuted new graphics and a new logo, similar to San Antonio's WOAI.

On July 29, 2014, it was announced that the noon newscast on WCYB would be shortened to a 30-minute segment, followed by an episode of Judge Judy with anchors Preston Ayres and Samantha Kozsey rotating positions each week. Meteorologist Donnie Cox will be co-hosting with Ayres and Kozsey. WCYB continues to be the dominant station in the Tri-Cities, with WEMT and WJHL closely tied for second.

On February 20, 2015, it was announced that Meteorologist Donnie Cox would be moving to WCTI-TV in New Bern, North Carolina.

At one point, WCYB-DT2 aired an hour-long extension of the main channel's weekday morning show at 8. This has since been dropped.

Technical information

Subchannels
The station's digital signal is multiplexed:

On August 23, 2011, Disney-ABC Television Group announced an affiliation agreement with WCYB to carry Live Well Network on a new third digital subchannel. The network has since been replaced with Decades, which in turn was eventually replaced with Comet.

Analog-to-digital conversion
WCYB-TV shut down its analog signal, over VHF channel 5, on June 12, 2009, the official date in which full-power television stations in the United States transitioned from analog to digital broadcasts under federal mandate. The station's digital signal relocated from its pre-transition UHF channel 28 to VHF channel 5. 

On August 22, 2022, WCYB turned off its signal on low-VHF channel 5 and activated a new signal on UHF channel 35 under special temporary authority.

Until 2022, WCYB operated a UHF fill-in digital translator on channel 29 that helped viewers alleviate some signal reception issues on channel 5. The station applied for a second repeater on channel 21, licensed to Kingsport with a transmitter on Bays Mountain, but this has since expired.

Out-of-market cable carriage
In recent years, WCYB has been carried on cable in multiple areas outside of the Tri-Cities media market. That includes cable systems within the Bluefield market in Virginia, the Lexington market in Kentucky, and the Asheville, Charlotte and Greensboro markets in North Carolina. According to Zap2it, WCYB has been carried on cable in College Grove, Tennessee, which is within the Nashville market.

During the 1970s and 1980s through CATV, WCYB was once carried in Pikeville, Kentucky, Wilkesboro, North Carolina, and McDowell County, West Virginia.

See also
Channel 35 digital TV stations in the United States
Channel 5 virtual TV stations in the United States

References

External links

CYB-TV
NBC network affiliates
The CW affiliates
Comet (TV network) affiliates
Television channels and stations established in 1956
Sinclair Broadcast Group
1956 establishments in Virginia